Novak Djokovic defeated Stanislas Wawrinka in the final, 4–6, 6–3, 6–3 to win the men's singles tennis title at the 2008 Italian Open.

Rafael Nadal was the three-time defending champion, but lost in the second round to Juan Carlos Ferrero. Notably, this is the first (and to date only) instance that Nadal lost his opening match at a clay court tournament.

Seeds
The top eight seeds receive a bye into the second round.

Draw

Finals

Top half

Section 1

Section 2

Bottom half

Section 3

Section 4

Qualifying

Qualifying seeds

Qualifiers

Qualifying draw

First qualifier

Second qualifier

Third qualifier

Fourth qualifier

Fifth qualifier

Sixth qualifier

Seventh qualifier

References

External links
 Draw
 Qualifying draw
 ITF tournament profile

Men's Singles
Italian Open - Singles